This is a list of women writers who were born in Portugal or whose writings are closely associated with that country.

A
Isabel Alçada (born 1950), children's writer
Rita Almeida (born 1974), economist, non-fiction writer
Ana Luísa Amaral (born 1956), poet
Sophia de Mello Breyner Andresen (1919–2004), poet

B
Maria Isabel Barreno (1939–2016)
Sara Beirão (1880–1974)
Agustina Bessa-Luís (1922–2019), novelist, theatre writer, essayist, children's writer, short story writer
Fiama Hasse Pais Brandão (1938–2007), poet, dramatist, translator, essayist
Lurdes Breda (born 1970), poet and children's writer

C
Amélia dos Santos Costa Cardia (1855–1938)
Dulce Maria Cardoso (born 1964), novelist
Maria Amália Vaz de Carvalho (1847–1921)
Maria Judite de Carvalho (1921–1998), novelist, short story writer, poet, playwright
Públia Hortênsia de Castro (1548–1595), poet and humanist
Violante do Ceo (1601 or 1607–1693), poet
Francisca Clotilde (1862-1935), Brazilian writer
Sara Pinto Coelho (1913–1990), playwright, novelist, short story writer, and children's writer
Clara Pinto Correia (born 1960), novelist, journalist
Hélia Correia (born 1949)
Natália Correia (1923–1993), poet, novelist, essayist
Maria Velho da Costa (1938–2020)

D
Luísa Dacosta (1927–2015)
Ana Daniel (1928–2011), poet
Vimala Devi (born 1932), writer, poet, translator

E
Florbela Espanca (1894–1930), poet
Sofia Ester (born 1978)

F
Rosa Lobato de Faria (1932–2010), scriptwriter, novelists, poet, songwriter
Susana Félix (born 1975), songwriter
Lília da Fonseca (1906-1991), feminist writer and journalist
Raquel Freire (born 1973), screenwriter, novelist

G
Joana da Gama (–1586), author
Teolinda Gersão (born 1940), novelist, educator
Luísa Costa Gomes, chronicler, librettist, novelist, playwright, screenwriter
Ana Maria Gonçalves (born 1970), novelist
Olga Gonçalves (1929–2004), poet, novelist
Maria Teresa Maia Gonzalez (born 1958), children's writer, writer of young adult literature
Lutegarda Guimarães de Caires (1873–1935), poet and women's rights activist
Regina Guimarães (born 1957), poet, playwright, lyricist

H
Ana Hatherly (1929–2015), poet, pioneer of experimental poetry
Maria Teresa Horta (born 1937), feminist poet, journalist

J
Lídia Jorge (born 1946), novelist

L
Bernarda de Lacerda (1596–1644), playwright
Irene Lisboa (1892–1958), short story writer, poet, essayist, educational writer
Susan Lowndes Marques (1907–1993), travel books about Portugal

M
Maria Aurora (1937–2010), journalist, poet, novelist, children's writer, associated with Madeira
Isa Meireles (c. 1932–2008), journalist, children's writer
Eugénia Melo e Castro (born 1958), songwriter
Pilar Homem de Melo (born 1963), songwriter 
Isabel Meyrelles (born 1929), poet, sculptor
Amélia Muge (born 1952), lyricist

O
Raquel Ochoa (born 1980), journalist, travel writer and novelist

P
Inês Pedrosa (born 1962), journalist, novelist, short story writer, children's writer, playwright
Ana Teresa Pereira (born 1958), novelist
Ana Plácido (1831–1895), novelist

S
Isabel Stilwell (born 1960) Historical novels

V
Joana Vaz (–1570), Latin scholar and poet
Amélia Veiga (born 1931), Portuguese-born Angolan poet, educator
Mafalda Veiga (born 1965), songwriter
Ana Vicente (1943–2015), feminist and children's writer
Alice Vieira (born 1943), children's writer

See also
List of Portuguese writers
List of women writers

Further reading
Dicionário de escritoras portuguesas das origens à actualidade

References

-
Portuguese
Writers
Writers, Women